"The Long Goodbye" is a song written by Irish singer-songwriters Paul Brady and Ronan Keating for Brady's 2000 album Oh What a World. In October 2001, it was released by American country music duo Brooks & Dunn as the third single from their album Steers & Stripes. Ronan Keating released his version in April 2003 as the last single from his album Destination (2002).

Track listing
 Promotional CD single
 "The Long Goodbye" – 3:57

Brooks & Dunn version

"The Long Goodbye" was recorded by country music duo Brooks & Dunn for their album Steers & Stripes (2001). The single was Number One hit on the Billboard Hot Country Singles & Tracks (now Hot Country Songs) charts, and a No. 39 hit on the Billboard Hot 100.

Background
Ronnie Dunn was initially challenged by this song. "For me, I didn't know if I could sing some of these songs, if I could get inside them. So I'd take the tracks home...Paul Brady's demo of 'The Long Good-bye was intimidating...How do you do that? I'd work in my barn, explore the songs, try things, really learn where the song wanted to go, where I wanted to go."

Critical reception
Chuck Taylor, of Billboard magazine reviewed the song favorably saying that the song has more of a pop flavor than most of their other music. Taylor also says that Dunn's "earnest emotion exudes quiet desperation mixed with knowing acceptance."

Cover versions
Country music singer Faith Hill covered the song from The Last Rodeo Tour

Charts
"The Long Goodbye" debuted at number 53 on the U.S. Billboard Hot Country Singles & Tracks chart for the week of 27 October 2001.

Weekly charts

Year-end charts

Ronan Keating version

"The Long Goodbye" was released as the fourth and last single from Irish singer-songwriter Ronan Keating's second studio album, Destination (2002). The album version was produced by Calum MacColl and Liam Bradley while the single version was produced by Stephen Lipson. The single peaked at number three on the UK Singles Chart, number 10 in Ireland, and reached the top 50 in Australia, Austria, Germany, and New Zealand.

Track listings
UK CD1
 "The Long Goodbye"
 "Love Won't Work (If We Don't Try)"
 "This Is It"
 "The Long Goodbye" (video)

UK CD2
 "The Long Goodbye"
 "We've Got Tonight" (featuring Jeanette)
 "Love Won't Work (If We Don't Try)" (video)

European CD single
 "The Long Goodbye"
 "The Long Goodbye" (Bimbo Jones vocal mix)

Credits and personnel
Credits for the album version are lifted from the Destination album booklet.

Studios
 Recorded at various studios in Los Angeles, London, and Dublin
 Mixed at Olympic Studios (London, England)
 Engineered at Clonmannon Studios (County Wicklow, Ireland)
 Mastered at Gateway Mastering (Portland, Maine, US)

Personnel

 Ronan Keating – writing
 Paul Brady – writing
 Janet Ramus – background vocals
 Tracy Ackerman – background vocals
 Liam Bradley – backing vocals, drums, percussion, production
 Calum MacColl – backing vocals, guitar, production
 Steve Jones – guitar, programming
 Paul Turner – bass guitar
 James McNally – piano, bodhrán
 Kieran Kiely – piano, Hammond
 Yoad Nevo – programming
 Máire Breatnach – violin
 Fiachra Terence W. Trench – string arrangement
 Avril Mackintosh – additional vocal production
 Jeremy Wheatley – mixing
 Alastair McMillan – engineering
 Bob Ludwig – mastering

Charts

Weekly charts

Year-end charts

Release history

References

2001 singles
2001 songs
2003 singles
Arista Nashville singles
Brooks & Dunn songs
Country ballads
Paul Brady songs
Polydor Records singles
Pop ballads
Ronan Keating songs
Rykodisc singles
Song recordings produced by Mark Wright (record producer)
Songs written by Paul Brady
Songs written by Ronan Keating